Majesty of the Seas (subsequently renamed Majesty, then Majesty of the Oceans) is a  owned by Seajets and formerly owned and operated by Royal Caribbean International. She was built at the Chantiers de l'Atlantique shipyards in Saint-Nazaire, France, and placed in service on 26 April 1992. The cruise ship offered guests 4 and 5-night Caribbean getaways. She sailed from Florida. Her Godmother is Queen Sonja of Norway. As of January 2023, she is the only remaining Sovereign-class ship, although laid up since sale to Seajets in December 2020.

Description
The ship has a casino and 11 passenger elevators, two of which are glass-walled, various bars, two swimming pools, four hot tubs, a basketball court, and a rock climbing wall. The ship holds 2,350 guests at double occupancy and a maximum of 2,767 guests.

Service history

On 12 January 2007, Majesty of the Seas entered a 4-week dry-dock period where she underwent a multimillion-dollar refurbishment of the pool decks, all public areas, restaurants, shops, centrum and cabins.

Plans to transfer Majesty of the Seas to Pullmantur in 2016 had been announced on 21 November 2014, however in July 2015, Royal Caribbean reversed those plans, instead stating that Majesty of the Seas would stay with Royal Caribbean International.

Majesty of the Seas was dry-docked after her 29 April 2016 cruise to receive several upgrades, a children's water play area, a poolside movie screen, and modifications to the casino.

COVID-19 pandemic
During the COVID-19 pandemic, the CDC reported, as early as 22 April 2020, that at least one person who tested positive for SARS-CoV-2 was symptomatic while on board. From 14 March 2020 the ship's cruising operations were suspended due to the COVID-19 pandemic.

Sale to SeaJets
In December 2020, Royal Caribbean sold Majesty of the Seas to Seajets who renamed her Majesty. Seajets renamed the ship Majesty of the Oceans in April 2021, while still laid up at Piraeus.

Scale model
A th scale model of Majesty of the Seas was built in Morsbach, by François Zanella. The model was launched in 2005 and performs river cruises in and around Paris, France.

References

External links

 Majesty of the Seas former Official Site

Ships of Seajets
Cruise ships of Norway
Ships of Royal Caribbean International
Ships built in France
1991 ships